The Korean War Veterans Memorial Bridge, formerly known as Gateway Bridge, is a vehicular bridge that carries Korean Veterans Boulevard over the Cumberland River in Nashville, within the U.S. state of Tennessee.

History
The idea of building the Gateway Bridge was conceived in 1996, as a way to turn the 1909 Shelby Street Bridge into a pedestrian bridge. The Shelby Street Bridge had later been renamed the Korean War Veterans of Tennessee Memorial Bridge, and a commemorative plaque was installed. In 1998, the Shelby Street Bridge was closed to traffic. When it was reopened as the John Seigenthaler Pedestrian Bridge in 2003, the memorial plaque had been removed.

Construction on the Gateway Bridge began in 2001, and it was completed in 2004. It was built by Ray Bell Construction. In 2006, it was renamed in honor of veterans of the Korean War.

The bridge was renovated with light-emitting diodes by Domingo Gonzalez Associates in 2016.

The bridge is prominently featured as part of the Nashville Street Circuit. It is one of the few large bridges to be used on a street circuit anywhere in the world.

References

Bridges completed in 2004
2004 establishments in Tennessee
Bridges over the Cumberland River
Buildings and structures in Nashville, Tennessee
Korean War memorials and cemeteries